It's All Happening is a 1963 British musical film directed by Don Sharp and starring Tommy Steele, Michael Medwin and Angela Douglas.

It is sometimes known under the alternative title The Dream Maker.

Premise
A talent scout for a record company is frustrated by his lack of progress with his career. When the orphanage where he was brought up is threatened with closing, he decides to organize a concert featuring all the most up-to-date singers and bands.

Selected cast
 Tommy Steele - Billy Bowles 
 Michael Medwin - Max Catlin 
 Angela Douglas - Julie Singleton 
 Jean Harvey - Delia 
 Bernard Bresslaw - Parsons 
 Walter Hudd - J.B. Magdeburg 
 John Tate - Julian Singleton 
 Janet Henfrey - April 
 Richard Goolden - Lord Sweatstone
 Keith Faulkner - Mick  
 Edward Cast - Hugh  
 Anthony Dawes - Cyril Bong

Production
Produced for $430,000, the film was shot and ready for release in cinemas in only six weeks.  Director Don Sharp had made a similar musical The Golden Disc.

Don Sharp was directing television when approached to work on the film. He says he was brought on to the film by Philip Green, who had worked with Sharp on Ha Penny Breeze. According to Sharp, Green was music director for EMI and suggested they record tracks for their recording artists, which formed the basis of the film. Sharp says the film featured most of EMI's key artists at the time.

Filming took place at Shepperton Studios in January 1963. Angela Douglas, who has a leading role, recalled in her memoirs that Steele "was terrific, making me feel good, putting me at ease" and that "they were a marvelous crew, fun and relaxed."

Songs
"The Wind And The Rain" by Johnny De Little
"The Dream Maker" by Tommy Steele
"Meeting You" by Dick Kallman
"Maximum Plus" by Tommy Steele and Marion Ryan 
"Somebody Else Not Me" by Shane Fenton and the Fentones
"Egg And Chips" by Tommy Steele
"That's Livin' - That's Lovin'" by Marion Ryan
"Day Without You" by Danny Williams 
"Flamenco" by Russ Conway
"Summertime" by (Philip Green, Norman Newell)
"Once Upon A Time In Venice" by - John Boulter
"It's Summer" by Dai Francis
"Watching All The World Go By" by Tony Mercer
"The Boy On The Beach" by Carol Deene
"It's Summer" by The George Mitchell Singers
Finale  "The Dream Maker"  by Tommy Steele And The George Mitchell Singers

Critical reception
Variety said "The warmly exuberant personality of Tommy Steele, plus some polished, slick performances by guest top pop United Kingdom artists, solidly jacks up a lazy, old-fashioned and flabby screenplay by Leigh Vance."
TV Guide said of the film: "a number of England's pop singers and groups of the 1960s are on display in this variety show held together by a slim story line"."
The New York Times observed, "young Mr. Steele, all teeth and yellow hair, gives his all to the role."
The Radio Times called the film "sentimental hokum...The songs sound as though they were knocked out on a slow afternoon on Denmark Street, London's very own Tin Pan Alley."
AllMovie called it an "engaging children's musical."

References

External links

It's All Happening at Letterbox DVD
Review at the Spinning Image

1963 films
1963 musical films
Films directed by Don Sharp
British musical films
1960s English-language films
1960s British films